in Amsterdam, The Netherlands, is a historical establishment, probably dating from the 17th century. It has a gable roof from the first half of the 18th century. The building is currently used as a shop, together with the adjacent buildings (numbers 27 to 35) by  Aurora, a supplier of electrical and electronic products. The building has the status of "" (national monument).

References 
 Rijksmonumentenregister
 Dutch National Monuments

17th century in the Dutch Republic
Rijksmonuments in Amsterdam
18th century in the Dutch Republic
Shops in Amsterdam
Houses completed in the 17th century